Sviridenko, Svyrydenko, or Svirydzienka is a surname. Notable people with the surname include:

 Dmitry Sviridenko (born 1997), Belarusian footballer
 Pavel Sviridenko (born 1985), Russian footballer
 Georgi Sviridenko (born 1962), Soviet-Belarusian handball player
 Yulia Svyrydenko (born 1985), Ukrainian politician

See also
 

Ukrainian-language surnames